Punch-Drunk Love is a 2002 American absurdist romantic comedy-drama film written and directed by Paul Thomas Anderson, and starring Adam Sandler, Emily Watson, Philip Seymour Hoffman, Luis Guzmán, and Mary Lynn Rajskub. It follows an entrepreneur with social anxiety who falls in love with his sister's co-worker. The film was produced by Revolution Studios and New Line Cinema, and distributed by Columbia Pictures. 

Following the release of his previous film, Magnolia (1999), Anderson was determined to make his next film a ninety-minute romantic comedy, with Sandler in mind as the lead due to Anderson's love for the actor and his films. It features the video art of Jeremy Blake in the form of visual interludes.

The film received positive reviews from critics, with Sandler's performance receiving widespread acclaim. However, the film was a box office bomb, failing to recoup its $25 million production budget at the box office. Retrospectively, Punch-Drunk Love is viewed as a favorite film of several prominent film directors and actors, and was seen as a launchpad for Sandler to pursue dramatic or unconventional film roles outside of his usual mainstream comedies.

Plot
Barry Egan is a bachelor who owns a company that markets themed toilet plungers and other novelty items. He has seven overbearing sisters who regularly ridicule and emotionally abuse him, so he leads a lonely life punctuated by fits of rage and social anxiety. One day, he witnesses an inexplicable car accident, picks up an abandoned harmonium from the street, and encounters Lena Leonard (a coworker of Elizabeth, one of his sisters). Lena had orchestrated the meeting after seeing him in Elizabeth's family picture at work.

Barry goes to his sister's birthday party, where they tease him about his sexuality, leading to a serious outburst in which he breaks his sister's sliding glass door. Afterwards, he asks his brother-in-law to refer him to a therapist. Instead, Barry calls a phone sex line to cope with his loneliness. The phone sex operator tries to extort money from him and then sends four henchmen, who are brothers, to collect. This complicates his budding relationship with Lena, as well as his plan to exploit a loophole in a Healthy Choice promotion and amass a million frequent-flyer miles by purchasing large quantities of pudding.

When Lena leaves for Hawaii on a business trip, Barry decides to follow her, using his sister to find Lena, who is overjoyed to see him. As the two spend time together, Barry's sister calls Lena, complicating matters, but Lena lies about having contact with Barry. The romance develops further, leading to Barry's relief from his emotional isolation.

On the return trip, the four brothers ram Barry's car, mildly injuring Lena. After fighting all four brothers off with a tire iron, Barry leaves Lena at the hospital and sets out to end the harassment. He calls the phone-sex line back and finds out the "supervisor" is the owner of a mattress store. Barry drives all the way to Provo, Utah, to confront the owner, Dean, face to face. At first, trying to intimidate Barry, Dean finds him more intimidating once he learns that Barry has come all the way from California. They both agree "that's that".

Barry returns home and goes to see Lena to explain why the accident happened. He begs for forgiveness, pledging his loyalty and to use his frequent-flier miles to accompany her on all future business trips after his pudding miles are processed.  Lena confesses she was more upset at being left at the hospital but forgives him and they embrace happily.

Cast 
 Adam Sandler as Barry Egan, an unmarried entrepreneur with social anxiety
 Emily Watson as Lena Leonard, Barry's love interest and Elizabeth's friend and coworker
 Philip Seymour Hoffman as Dean Trumbell, the owner of the mattress store
 Mary Lynn Rajskub as Elizabeth Egan, Barry's overbearing sister
 Luis Guzmán as Lance, Barry's coworker
 Robert Smigel as Walter, a dentist and Barry's brother-in-law

Production

After the success of Magnolia (1999), writer-director Paul Thomas Anderson stated that he was determined to make his next film ninety minutes long, and stated that he wanted to cast Adam Sandler in a future film. After establishing his style with his previous films, he wanted to challenge himself within the parameters of a ninety-minute-long romantic comedy. Anderson is a fan of Sandler's films, describing his love for his movies as "obsession-level," and was determined to make a film with Sandler as a lead, saying, "He's always just made me laugh, he gets me, I wanted a piece of him." He specifically wrote Punch-Drunk Love with Sandler and Emily Watson in mind. Anderson had to convince producer JoAnne Sellar, who was "befuddled" with his desire to cast Sandler, that he was the right person for the job. Anderson took inspiration for Barry Egan's characterization from watching the Saturday Night Live: The Best of Adam Sandler compilation DVD, primarily with the skit "The Denise Show," saying,

Anderson described the film as an "art-house Adam Sandler film," while film critic Roger Ebert felt Anderson "deconstructed the Adam Sandler movies and put them back together again in a new way at a different level." In writing the elements of the Healthy Choice frequent-flier miles sub-plot line, Anderson was inspired by the real-life story of David Phillips, who successfully amassed over a million frequent flier miles from buying $3,000 worth of Healthy Choice's pudding. Anderson received approval from Phillips and Healthy Choice to adapt Phillips' story into the film. A major source of inspiration for Punch-Drunk Love came from the films of Jacques Tati, while Barry's blue suit was inspired by musicals such as The Band Wagon (1953) and Singin' in the Rain (1952).

Filming and editing took place within over a year and a half due to several reasons, such as Anderson scrapping the first two weeks of shooting over fears that he was "making the same movie" as his previous filmography, as well as the threat of Hollywood strikes in 2001 that led to Sandler and Watson filming other projects in between filming Punch-Drunk Love. Anderson also declined more funding from Revolution Studios, as he was determined to keep the film under $30 million in terms of budget.

Casting 
Sandler shared phone numbers with Magnolia star Tom Cruise when he visited Saturday Night Live during the taping of an episode hosted by Cruise's then-wife Nicole Kidman. While filming Magnolia, Anderson contacted Sandler through a phone call with Cruise and expressed his intention to write a movie for him; despite being unfamiliar with Anderson, Sandler gave his blessing. Sandler was intimidated upon first viewing Magnolia, leading him to be "fucking terrified" and doubt his ability to carry Anderson's next film. Anderson helped alleviate Sandler's fears upon personally being delivered the script. Sandler's casting was officially announced in November 2000; the unconventional pairing shocked reporters as Anderson was a filmmaker on the rise that wrote and directed critically-acclaimed films, while Sandler was known for negatively-reviewed mainstream comedies. Aside from the primary named cast, all on-screen actors are non-professionals, which Anderson found more interesting and less complicated.

Music

The score to Punch-Drunk Love was composed by Jon Brion. As with Magnolia, Brion and Anderson collaborated heavily for the production of the film's score. However, rather than scoring the film after rough footage had been shot, Brion made compositions while making the film. During the scoring process, Brion would experiment with tones and sounds, carefully making note of what Anderson would respond to. Anderson himself would create the vocal tempos he would envision in the score and use them on set, even to the extent of inspiring the pace of Sandler's performance.

The film's score features no harmonium outside of the notes Adam Sandler plays on it in the score.  Brion introduced the instrument to Anderson during their work on Magnolia, however an article stating it was used heavily in the score is incorrect per Brion’s account. Many scenes between Sandler's character and the instrument were inspired by Brion. For instance, Brion once found a harmonium with a hole in its bellows before going on tour with Aimee Mann. To fix the problem, he covered the hole with duct tape. The situation is mirrored in the film.

Reception

Box office
The film began a limited domestic release on October 11, 2002, grossing $118,539 from five theaters. It went on to gross $17.8 million in the United States, and an international total of $6.8 million, for a worldwide box office total of $24.6 million.

Critical reception

On review aggregator Rotten Tomatoes, the film holds an approval rating of 79% based on 197 reviews, with an average rating of 7.40/10. The website's critical consensus states, "Odd, touching, and unique, Punch-Drunk Love is also delightfully funny, utilizing Adam Sandler's comic persona to explore the life of a lonely guy who finds love." On Metacritic, the film has a weighted average score of 78 out of 100, based on 37 critics, indicating "generally favorable reviews". Audiences polled by CinemaScore gave the film an average grade of "D+" on an A+ to F scale.

Writing for Rolling Stone, Peter Travers felt the pairing of Anderson and Sandler was "parallel lines that meet triumphantly in a mesmerizer that stays true to both of their anarchic spirits," and praised the cast's performances, ultimately calling the film's effect "intoxicating." Angie Errigo of Empire complimented Anderson's direction as "simply captivating and exquisitely controlled, with a restless mood and no end of fascinating, beautifully-orchestrated oddness," and said, "One of the joys of this film...is that you really have no idea what's going to happen next." Daniel Fierman of Entertainment Weekly thought the film was a "meditation on true love, the ways in which we are all bizarre, the magic of the perfect match, and the preposterously unlikely nature of the whole enterprise." The Los Angeles Times' Kenneth Turan stated that the film was "a comedy of discomfort and rage that turns unexpectedly sweet and pure." Writing for Variety, Todd McCarthy said that "there is no mistaking the exceeding creativity that has gone into nearly every shot, transition, narrative choice and musical selection," and praised Adam Sandler, Emily Watson, and Philip Seymour Hoffman's performances. He also opined that "Sandler fans will probably take it as a lightweight, but agreeable enough, outing with slightly weird elements to it, while Anderson partisans could split between those who will revel in the thrill of his ongoing creative inventions and others who may find this light lifting between heavy workouts." Charles Taylor of Salon.com described the film as a "manic-depressive romantic comedy that aspires to the soul of a musical," and complimented Anderson's direction, Christopher Scarabosio's sound design, and Jon Brion's score. He believed that Anderson properly utilized the "threat of sudden, bellowing, red-faced rage" of Sandler's known comic persona in the film.

David Ansen of Newsweek described the film as "a romantic comedy on the verge of a nervous breakdown," praising the film's unpredictability and cinematography, but felt Lena was underwritten, concluding that it was "an emotional jigsaw puzzle that's missing a couple of crucial pieces." Giving the film three stars out of five, Peter Bradshaw of The Guardian felt the story was "deeply unconvincing" and "a short cut to an entirely unearned emotional resolution that doesn't begin to illuminate the jagged and disturbing - and gripping - ideas that swirl around the beginning of this film," and felt the film's core romance was "the most bafflingly unreal love story you can imagine."

Adam Sandler's lead performance received acclaim. Giving the film three-and-a-half stars out of four, Roger Ebert of the Chicago Sun-Times praised Sandler's performance in his review, saying, "Sandler, liberated from the constraints of formula, reveals unexpected depths as an actor. Watching this film, you can imagine him in Dennis Hopper roles. He has darkness, obsession and power. He can't go on making those moronic comedies forever, can he?" Errigo called the film "an anti-Adam Sandler movie that proves to be a highly defining moment for the actor" and called Sandler's performance "astonishing." She also felt Watson was "relishing a calming character who is on an even keel." Entertainment Weekly's Owen Gleiberman said Sandler was "utterly winning to watch" and added that "he has become a tender and arresting presence, like a fusion of Chaplin’s Little Tramp, Woody Allen, and Edward Scissorhands." Desson Thomson of The Washington Post proclaimed that Sandler gave "the performance of his life" in the film.

Accolades
Sandler went on to win Best Actor at the Gijón International Film Festival for his performance and was also nominated for the Golden Globe Award for Best Actor – Motion Picture Musical or Comedy. Anderson won the award for Best Director at the 2002 Cannes Film Festival and the film was nominated for the Palme d'Or. The film was nominated for the Grand Prix of the Belgian Syndicate of Cinema Critics.

Home media
The film was released on VHS and DVD by Columbia TriStar Home Entertainment on June 24, 2003.

The Criterion Collection released the film on Blu-ray in November 2016 with a restored HD transfer, the first time the company had done so for Anderson and Sandler. It has behind-the-scenes featurette about a recording session for the film's soundtrack, a Cannes press conference and deleted scenes.

Legacy 
The film came in at #33 in The A.V. Club's "Top 50 films of the '00s". Filmmakers Lee Unkrich, Judd Apatow, Kleber Mendonça, Miranda July, Bong Joon-ho, Guillermo del Toro, Isabel Sandoval, Barry Jenkins and Taika Waititi, and actors Bill Nighy, Owen Wilson, Austin Butler, and Timothée Chalamet have cited it as one of their favorite films.

When asked about Punch-Drunk Love following its twentieth anniversary in 2022, Sandler said that the film that enabled him to pursue films different from his usual roles, while also sharing that it helped forge a close friendship between him and Anderson. The two reunited in their first project since Punch-Drunk Love when Anderson helped film segments of Sandler's Netflix comedy special 100% Fresh (2018).

Critics agreed that Punch-Drunk Love remained as one of Sandler's best acting performances, and was a launchpad for Sandler to take on dramatic roles or opportunities outside of his usual mainstream comedies. In a retrospective review following its 2017 release on Netflix, GQ's Miranda Popkey called the film "Adam Sandler’s finest performance and P.T. Anderson’s most underrated work," describing it as "a paean to love as a source of unfathomable power." Far Out's Arun Starkey described Punch-Drunk Love as Sandler's "first true foray into auteur cinema" and "the first indicator of his prowess as an actor and shows that if he is given a good enough script that isn’t shackled by the tropes of a mainstream genre, he can actually do very well at carrying a three-dimensional character onto the big screen." Alan Dorich of Comic Book Resources shared that the film's critical success "changed the course of Sandler's career forever" and "opened new opportunities that enhanced his legacy as a performer," leading to other dramatic roles in films such as Men, Women & Children (2014), The Meyerowitz Stories (2017), and Uncut Gems (2019).

References

External links

 
 
 
 Early draft screenplay  for Punch-Drunk Love from dailyscript.com
Punch-Drunk Love: A Delegate Speaks an essay by Miranda July at the Criterion Collection

2002 films
2002 romantic drama films
American romantic drama films
Columbia Pictures films
Films directed by Paul Thomas Anderson
Films scored by Jon Brion
Films set in Los Angeles
Films set in Hawaii
Films shot in California
Films shot in Honolulu
Films with screenplays by Paul Thomas Anderson
New Line Cinema films
Revolution Studios films
Films set in the San Fernando Valley
2000s English-language films
2000s American films